|}

The Anaglog's Daughter Mares Novice Chase, currently run as the Coolmore National Hunt Mogul Novice Chase for sponsorship reasons, is a Grade 2 National Hunt novice steeplechase in Ireland which is open to mares aged five years or older. It is run at Thurles over a distance of 2 miles and 4½ furlongs (2 miles 4 furlongs and 118 yard, or 4,131 metres) and during the race there are fourteen fences to be jumped. The race is scheduled to take place each year in January.

The race was first run in 2003, as a Listed race, was awarded Grade 3 status in 2004 and became a Grade 2 race in 2013.

Records
Leading jockey (3 wins):
 Davy Russell – 	Carlito Brigante (2009), Tally Em Up (2010), Knockfierna (2012) 
 Ruby Walsh -  Pomme Tiepy (2008), Vroum Vroum Mag (2015), Westerner Lady (2017) 
 Paul Townend -  Camelia de Cotte (2019), Colreevy (2021)  Allegorie De Vassy (2023) 

Leading trainer  (6 wins):
 Willie Mullins – Pomme Tiepy (2008), Vroum Vroum Mag (2015), Westerner Lady (2017), Camelia de Cotte (2019), Elimay (2020), Colreevy (2021), Allegorie De Vassy (2023)

Winners

See also
Horse racing in Ireland
List of Irish National Hunt races

References
Racing Post:

National Hunt chases
National Hunt races in Ireland
Thurles Racecourse